Historic Hite is a flooded ghost town at the north end of Lake Powell along the Colorado River in western San Juan County, Utah, United States. Lake Powell, and all of its points of interest, are in the Glen Canyon National Recreation Area, managed by the National Park Service and available to the public for recreation. The town existed on land that Lake Powell now covers. Hite was named for Cass Hite, an early settler. The name was transferred to a National Park Recreation Area at the north end of Lake Powell. The Hite Crossing Bridge, near the marina, carries Utah State Route 95 over the Colorado River and connects the area to the north of the lake.

Climate
According to the Köppen Climate Classification system, Hite has a semi-arid climate, abbreviated "BSk" on climate maps.

References

External links
Arizona Boating Locations Facilities Map
Arizona Fishing Locations Map

Lake Powell
Ghost towns in Utah
Ghost towns in San Juan County, Utah
1881 establishments in Utah Territory
Populated places established in 1881
Populated places disestablished in 1963